The France national handball team is supervised by the French Handball Federation, and represents France in international matches. It is the first handball team to have held all three titles twice (the Danish women's team also held all three in 1997), and the only national team in its sport to hold six world titles and a total of eleven medals at the World Men's Handball Championship. With a total of five medals, including three gold in 2008, 2012 and 2021, France is also the most successful Handball team at the Summer Olympics. As of August 2021, they are the defending Olympic Champions.

France's men handball team is widely regarded as the finest national team in the history of the sport.

Results at international tournaments
Since the 1990s, France has emerged as a major handball team. France won the bronze medal in the 1992 Summer Olympics, giving birth to their first nickname: les Bronzés (meaning tanned in French, a reference both to bronze and to cult French film Les Bronzés). This led to an increased popularity of the sport in France, which was already one of the most popular in primary and secondary schools.

One year after their Olympic medal, les Bronzés reached the final of the 1993 World Championship, which they lost against Russia.

In 1995, France won the World Championship in Iceland, defeating Croatia in the final. The team became known as les Barjots because the players played the final with an extravagant haircut (barjot is a slang word for crazy in French).

The team finished 4th in the 1996 Summer Olympics (France lost the bronze medal game to Spain, whom they had beaten in the first round). France finished third a year later in the 1997 World Championship. The team finished 6th in the 1999 World Championship and in the 2000 Summer Olympics.

France won the world title again in the 2001 World Championship organised in France. During both their quarterfinal and final, against Germany and Sweden respectively, they were one goal behind until a few seconds before the end of the game, but scored a late goal and finally win in overtime with a three-goal margin. This great strength of character was cause for their new nickname: les Costauds (the strong, or the tough). Five members of les Costauds had already been world champions in 1995 with les Barjots: Jackson Richardson, Grégory Anquetil, Patrick Cazal, and the goalkeepers Bruno Martini and Christian Gaudin.

The team finished third in the 2003 World Championship. In the 2004 Olympics, the teamed finished 5th. Although they won their five games of the preliminary round, the team lost to an ageing Russian team led by 42-year-old goalkeeper Andrey Lavrov in the quarterfinals (24–26).

In the 2005 World Championship, France finished third again. This was the last international competition played by Jackson Richardson, a veteran from the first team les Bronzés. The retirement of their star meant for the French team the final transition between the early successes and the new generation of players.

In 2006 France won for the first time the European Championship, a competition in which they had never won a medal until then. In the final, they overwhelmed Spain, the reigning world champions (31–23), against whom they had lost the opening match in the preliminary round.

In 2008, France finished third in the European Championship. They were undefeated until the semi-final, which they lost to Croatia.

France won the gold medal in the Beijing Olympics. The French players elected to call themselves Les Experts, which is the French title for the TV show CSI in France. The team won the gold medal in the 2008 handball tournament in Beijing, defeating underdogs Iceland in the final (28–23). Thierry Omeyer, Daniel Narcisse and Bertrand Gille were voted into the tournament's All Star team.

France won the world title again in 2009 at the 2009 World Championship, hosted by Croatia, against the organizing country, and the European title in 2010 in Austria, once more against Croatia. As a result, they became the first men's team to hold the three major titles in the sport (olympic title, world title and European title) simultaneously (Denmark women's national handball team held all three titles in 1997). It also became the third team to have won all three titles ever, the other two being Germany and Russia.

In the 2011 World Championship, France held its title, winning against Denmark (37–35 after extra time). This victory, in addition to granting an automatic participation to the 2012 Olympics, marked several achievements:

 it became, with Romania (1964, 1974) and Sweden (1958), one of the few handball teams (on the men's side) to have successfully defended a world champion status;
 it became (and is the only, so far) the first national handball team in history to have won four major titles in a row;
 three players on the team (Jérôme Fernandez, Thierry Omeyer and Didier Dinart) achieved three world champions titles – putting them on par with Cornel Oţelea from Romania in the 60s (had he been present in 2009, Bertrand Gille would also have been one of them, but he missed 2009 due to injuries).

The 2012 and 2013 years were a mixed bag for the team; after an unexpected setback at the 2012 European championship where the team ended up in 11th place, it went on to be the first national handball team to retain the Olympic title at the London Olympic games. In 2013, they ended up being defeated by Croatia in this year's world championship.

2014 saw France regain its European title after losing it in 2012. Of note is that just like in 2009, the team ended up winning the final against the host country.

In 2015, they won their 5th World Champion title against host country Qatar. Thierry Omeyer was elected Most Valuable Player of the tournament; this was the first time in the IHF history that a goalkeeper was elected as an MVP. By doing so, they became the first team in the history of the sport to hold the three major titles for the second time.

In 2016, Les Experts lost their Olympic title in Rio, finishing second after a defeat in final against Denmark.

In 2017, they won their 6th World Champion title at home against Norway (33–26). Nikola Karabatic was elected Most Valuable Player of the tournament. Thierry Omeyer and Daniel Narcisse retired after the tournament, with two Olympic gold medals, three European titles, and respectively five and four world championship titles.

Honours
Olympic Games
 Gold Medal: 2008, 2012, 2020
 Silver Medal: 2016
 Bronze Medal: 1992

World Championship
 Winners: 1995, 2001, 2009, 2011, 2015, 2017
 Runners-up: 1993, 2023
 Third-place: 1997, 2003, 2005, 2019

European Championship
 Winners: 2006, 2010, 2014
 Third-place: 2008, 2018

Competitive record
 Champions   Runners-up   Third place   Fourth place

Olympic Games

World Championship

European Championship

*Denotes draws include knockout matches decided in a penalty shootout.

Current squad
Squad for the 2023 World Men's Handball Championship.

Head coach: Guillaume Gille

Records

Most capped players

Last updated: 11 January 2023

Top goalscorers

Last updated: 11 January 2023

Kit suppliers
Since 2002, France's kit is supplied by Adidas.

References

External links

IHF profile

Men's national handball teams
Handball in France
National sports teams of France